Esko Silvennoinen (12 August 1931 – 18 November 2020) was a Finnish field hockey player. He competed in the men's tournament at the 1952 Summer Olympics.

References

External links
 

1931 births
2020 deaths
Finnish male field hockey players
Olympic field hockey players of Finland
Field hockey players at the 1952 Summer Olympics
Sportspeople from Vyborg